Henrik Schneider (born 5 February 1969) is a Hungarian rower. He competed in the men's coxless pair event at the 1992 Summer Olympics.

References

1969 births
Living people
Hungarian male rowers
Olympic rowers of Hungary
Rowers at the 1992 Summer Olympics
Rowers from Budapest